The Sylvan Lake Wranglers are a junior "B" ice hockey team based in Sylvan Lake, Alberta, Canada. They are members of the North Division of the Heritage Junior B Hockey League (HJHL). They play their home games at Nexsource Center. 

Prior to the 2007–08 season the team was known as the Lacombe Wranglers before re-locating to Blackfalds. The Wranglers have won five HJHL championships, three provincial titles (most of any HJHL team), and a Keystone Cup. 
For the start of the 2019-20 season, Blackfalds moved up to Jr. A hockey and Sylvan Lake became the home of the Wranglers.

Season-by-season record

Note: GP = Games played, W = Wins, L = Losses, T = Ties, OTL = Overtime Losses, Pts = Points, GF = Goals for, GA = Goals against, PIM = Penalties in minutes

Russ Barnes Trophy
Alberta Jr. B Provincial Championships

Keystone Cup
Western Canadian Jr. B Championships (Northern Ontario to British Columbia)
Six teams in round robin play. 1st vs. 2nd for gold/silver & 3rd vs. 4th for bronze.

See also
List of ice hockey teams in Alberta

External links
Official website of the Blackfalds Wranglers

Blackfalds
Ice hockey teams in Alberta